John Arvid Skistad (born 25 April 1968) is a retired Norwegian football defender.

Playing several seasons for Lørenskog, he joined Stabæk ahead of the 1992 season. He stayed for 11 seasons, playing 239 games in league, cup and European competitions. In 2003 he played for Moss, came out of retirement to play for Skeid in 2005, and then lowly Skårer from Lørenskog in 2006.

References

1968 births
Living people
Norwegian footballers
People from Lørenskog
Stabæk Fotball players
Moss FK players
Skeid Fotball players
Eliteserien players
Norwegian First Division players
Association football defenders
Sportspeople from Viken (county)